The Mexico national under-17 football team is one of the youth teams that represents Mexico in football at the under-17 level, and is controlled by the Mexican Football Federation (Spanish: Federación Mexicana de Fútbol). The team has reached the final of the FIFA U-17 World Cup four times, and is a two-time winner, being crowned champions in 2005 and 2011.

History

2005
Mexico was placed in Group C along with Australia, Turkey and Uruguay in which Mexico came in second behind Turkey. In the knockout stage, an extra-time victory over zone rivals Costa Rica led to a then convincing victory over the Netherlands. Mexico ended up defeating Brazil 3–0 in the final.

2011

The 2011 FIFA U-17 World Cup was held in home soil. Mexico was placed in Group A together with North Korea, Congo and the Netherlands. Mexico eventually finished first of their group after winning their three matches and advanced to the Round of 16 and the Quarter-Finals, where they won their matches against Panama and France respectively. In the semifinals, Mexico had to face Germany, the only other team in the competition who had not lost any of their matches. Germany had advantage during the first minutes of the second time, but Mexico came back to equalize the score after Jonathan Espericueta scored a second goal from a corner kick, where Julio Gómez was injured and left the field. However, Gómez came back in the dying minutes to score an overhead kick, the decisive goal in the final minute, the final score was 3-2 which translated into the first significant victory over Germany in history. Mexico  faced Uruguay in the final, defeating them 2–0 in a very closed match where the balance could have tilted any way. Briseño scored the first goal in the first half when Uruguay was the dominating side. During the second half Uruguay kept pressing on and started to dominate again looking for the equalizer however, during the last advances their defense became disorganized and in a counterattack Giovani Casillas scored the finishing goal. With this result Mexico became champions without losing a single game in the tournament and also became the first host nation to win the U-17 World Cup.

2013
As defending champions, Mexico was defeated 6-1 by Nigeria in their first match of the group stage. Despite being defeated by a large number of goals, Mexico could still advance to the next round by defeating rivals Iraq and Sweden in the group stage. In their way to the final match, Mexico won their matches against favorites Italy, Brazil and Argentina. In the final round, Mexico faced Nigeria for a second time, but the team lost once again and was left in second place of the tournament.

2015 
Mexico was lucky enough to make it to the 2015 FIFA U-17 World Cup which was held in Chile. They were placed in Group C along with Germany, Australia, Argentina and won two of their three matches of the group stage. Finishing number 1 on group stages they advanced to Round of 16. In order to make it to quarter finals, they had to defeat Chile and they dominated them by beating them 4–1. Mexico got the chance to go to semi-finals with a familiar rival from 2013, they went against Nigeria, unfortunately Nigeria defeated them in an intense game and they didn't make it to the Finals. Mexico had the chance on finishing strong with a Third Place title against Belgium in which they lost. The 17-year-old, Diego Cortés from the Mexico national football team finished the 2015 FIFA U-17 World Cup being known as making the best goal of the FIFA U-17 World Cup.

Results and fixtures 
The following matches have been played within the past 12 months.

 Legend

2022

Players

Current squad
The following 21 players were called up for the 2019 FIFA U-17 World Cup.

Competitive record

FIFA U-17 World Cup

CONCACAF U-17 Championship 

*Draws include knockout matches decided on penalty kicks

Honours 
FIFA U-17 World Cup
 Winners (2): 2005, 2011
 Runners-up (2): 2013, 2019
CONCACAF Under-17 Championship
 Winners (9): 1985, 1987, 1991, 1996, 2013, 2015, 2017, 2019, 2023
 Runners-up (1): 1992
 Third Place (1): 1983

See also 
 Mexico national football team
 Mexico national under-23 football team
 Mexico national under-20 football team
 Mexico women's national football team
 Mexico national beach football team
 Mexico national futsal team

References 

North American national under-17 association football teams
Football